George Newman may refer to:
George Newman (MP) (c. 1562–1627), Member of Parliament for Canterbury and Dover
 George Newman (cricketer) (1904–1982), English cricketer
 George Newman (doctor) (1870–1948), English public health physician
 George Newman, a fictional character played by “Weird Al” Yankovic in the film UHF
 George Gough Newman (1862–1929) South Australian educator